William Vesey Hargreaves (1888–1944) was an English professional footballer who played as a wing half.

References

1888 births
1944 deaths
People from Wombwell
English footballers
Association football wing halves
Darfield United F.C. players
Grimsby Town F.C. players
Mexborough Town F.C. players
English Football League players